This is a list of Northern Mariana Islands locations by per capita income. In the 2010 U.S. Census, the Northern Mariana Islands had a per capita income of $9,656 — the 2nd-lowest per capita income of any state or territory in the United States (only American Samoa had a lower per capita income). In the 2010 U.S. Census, the Northern Mariana Islands had a median household income of $19,958 — the 2nd-lowest of any state or territory of the United States (higher only than Puerto Rico's median household income).

Northern Mariana counties ranked by per capita income

Note: The Northern Mariana Islands does not have counties. The U.S. Census Bureau counts the 4 municipalities of the Northern Mariana Islands as county-equivalents.

Northern Mariana Islands villages ranked by per capita income

Many of the per capita incomes and median household incomes in the villages of the Northern Mariana Islands are among the lowest in the United States.

References

United States locations by per capita income
Economy of the Northern Mariana Islands